A microfactory either refers to a capital-light facility used for the local assembly of a complex product or system or a small (normally automated) factory for producing small quantities of products. The term was proposed by the Mechanical Engineer Laboratory (MEL) of Japan in 1990 and has recently been used to describe the approach of manufacturers like Arrival. The microfactory's main advantages are saving a substantial amount of space, energy, materials, time, and upfront capital costs. 

Due to their reduced dimensions, microfactories are normally highly automated.  They might contain automatic machine tools, assembly systems, quality inspection systems, material feed systems, waste elimination systems, a system to evaluate tool deterioration and a system to replace tools.

At least one proposed microfactory is being designed to make many of its own parts, i.e., a partially self-replicating machine.

A microfactory can also refer to a factory designed for flexible small batch production that can produce a wide variety of products as opposed to a single monolithic mass production type approach.  Typically the manufacturing processes of microfactories take advantage of digital fabrication technology such as 3D printing and CNC machines in order to accomplish this.  For example, Local Motors had microfactories in Phoenix, Ariz. and Knoxville, Tenn. The company built products, like the Rally Fighter prerunner sports car, in its microfactories.

See also
Automation
Numerical control
3D printing
Digital modeling and fabrication
Flexible manufacturing system
Distributed manufacturing
Agile manufacturing

References

External links
Japanese microfactory project
Microfactory picture
MicroManufacturing Conference

Emerging technologies
Manufacturing plants